The Dahlonega Gold Museum Historic Site is a Georgia state historic site located in Dahlonega that commemorates America's first gold rush and the mining history of Lumpkin County. The museum is housed in the historic Old Lumpkin County Courthouse built in 1836 and located in the center of the town square. It is the oldest surviving county courthouse in the state. The museum houses many artifacts from the gold rush of 1836, including gold nuggets, gold coins, and gold panning equipment, as well as an educational film and gift shop.

Annual events
Gold Rush Days (October)
Dahlonega's Old Fashion Christmas Celebration (December)
Dahlonega Gold Museum Open House (December)

Gallery

References

External links
Dahlonega Gold Museum State Historic Site
'Thar's Gold in Them Thar Hills': Gold and Gold Mining in Georgia, 1830s-1940s from the Digital Library of Georgia

State parks of Georgia (U.S. state)
Museums in Lumpkin County, Georgia
History museums in Georgia (U.S. state)
Mining museums in Georgia (U.S. state)
Gold museums
Former county courthouses in Georgia (U.S. state)